Novouralsk is the name of several inhabited localities in Russia.

Urban localities
Novouralsk, a closed town in Sverdlovsk Oblast

Rural localities
Novouralsk, Kaliningrad Oblast, a settlement in Dobrovolsky Rural Okrug of Krasnoznamensky District in Kaliningrad Oblast
Novouralsk, Orenburg Oblast, a selo in Novouralsky Selsoviet of Kuvandyksky District in Orenburg Oblast